SR7 may refer to:

 Six Chuter SR7
 SR postcode area
 Lockheed SR-71 Blackbird
 21791 Mattweegman
 Sony camcorders
 Soroush Rafiei

See also 

List of highways numbered 7